Lieutenant colonel Bernard Cruddas DSO (1 January 1882 – 23 December 1959) was a British Conservative politician.

Educated at Winchester College, Cruddas was commissioned into a volunteer battalion of the North Staffordshire Regiment in 1899, but the following year transferred to the Regular Army and the Northumberland Fusiliers. He reached the rank of Lieutenant colonel in World War I and was awarded the Distinguished Service Order.

He was elected as Member of Parliament (MP) for Wansbeck at the 1931 general election, and returned at the 1935 election. He stood down in 1940, and at the Wansbeck by-election on 29 July the Conservative candidate Donald Scott was returned unopposed.

References 

People educated at Winchester College
North Staffordshire Regiment officers
Royal Northumberland Fusiliers officers
British Army personnel of World War I
1882 births
1959 deaths
Conservative Party (UK) MPs for English constituencies
Companions of the Distinguished Service Order
UK MPs 1935–1945